"Pillows and Blankets" is the fourteenth episode of the third season of the American television series Community. It originally aired on April 5, 2012, on NBC.

Plot
Presented in the style of Ken Burns' documentary, The Civil War, what started as a casual disagreement about blankets and pillows blossoms into all-out war on the Greendale campus.

Continuing the plot of the previous episode, Abed's (Danny Pudi) pillow-fort faction (Pillowtown) and Troy's (Donald Glover) blanket-fort faction (Blanketsburg) confront each other in the study hall. A pillow fight breaks out when a pillow carelessly thrown by Star-Burns (Dino Stamatopoulos) collapses part of the Blanketsburg fort. Dean Pelton (Jim Rash) convinces Jeff (Joel McHale) to organize a meeting to get Troy and Abed back together and build a joint blanket-pillow fort worthy of a Guinness world record. At the meeting, Jeff half-heartedly attempts to reconcile the rivals with imaginary "friend hats." Troy gives Abed an "all-tomato", demanding that Abed demolish his pillow fort to make way for Troy's blanket fort, or else. Abed declines the ultimatum, and at midnight, members of Blanketsburg attack a fort made by Pillowtown. Troy then declares war on Pillowtown.

Jeff wants the war to continue so that he will not have to go to classes, so he gives each team an inspirational speech which keeps the war going. When Annie (Alison Brie) hears of this while treating (mildly) injured players, she refuses to reply to Jeff's text messages and emphasizes to him that Troy and Abed's friendship is at stake.

After a humiliating injury from one of the members of Pillowtown, Pierce (Chevy Chase) gives Abed the blueprints to a doomsday device he concocted. After Troy finds out about his plan, he gets Ben Chang (Ken Jeong) to attack Pillowtown with the force of preteen "security interns" whom he previously recruited at a bar mitzvah. After Chang's force starts winning the battle, Abed unleashes the doomsday device: Pierce attacking the boys in a full-body pillow suit. Abed then sends an email to members of Pillowtown outlining Troy's psychological vulnerabilities. When Troy receives the intercepted message from a hacker working for Blanketsburg, he sends an angry text message to Abed saying that no one else will have the patience to deal with Abed's issues. Jeff tries to hold a peace conference, but Abed and Troy only agree that whoever wins the war will get to stay in the apartment, while the loser must move out.

The next morning, a great battle occurs in the cafeteria. The battle concludes in anticlimax when Dean Pelton announces that the representative for Guinness was fired, whereupon both factions lose interest and disperse. After everyone has left, Abed and Troy continue pillow fighting, telling Jeff it will be the last thing they will ever do together. Jeff points out that their reluctance to stop the pillow fight indicates that, subconsciously, they don't actually want to part ways. Jeff then gives Abed and Troy the imaginary "friend hats" with which he had earlier tried to reconcile them, and the duo become friends again. He then reveals to the documentary crew that he actually went to the Dean's office to "retrieve" the friend hats instead of merely standing out of sight for a few minutes, since he does take the relationships of his friends seriously, even if he's not entirely sure why.

During the war, Britta (Gillian Jacobs) tries to get photographs of the events that occurred, only to mess up every photo, except for the final one with Abed and Troy becoming friends again. The narrator (Keith David) reveals that, in very Britta style, she was trying to get an image of light reflecting off a plate of waffles and took her lone great picture by accident.

Reception
The episode was watched by 3.00 million American viewers and gained a 1.3 18-49 rating. This was a series low in viewers for the show, although it was NBC's highest rated program of the night.

Robert Canning of IGN gave the episode a 10 out of 10, calling it a "stellar episode, twisting a pop culture reference in a way that not only provided laughs but a well-told story with heart." Barry Hertz of the National Post said "in a triumph of editing and plotting, we’re treated to not just a stellar parody of the oft-mocked documentary form, but a revealing and satisfying episode of Community itself, complete with strong characterization, story closure and wild, GIF-ready visuals to keep the Internet masses satiated." Tim Surette of TV.com applauded the characters' roles in the episode, saying "There was enough attention to make sure that every character had a great role in the war even though the bulk of the episode was just presentation. And at the heart of it all, we all wanted Troy and Abed to eventually make amends." Jenn Lee of BuddyTV said "While it wasn't an entirely dramatic episode (the mimicry took care of that), "Pillows and Blankets" didn't carry the same light-hearted tone as a typical Community storyline, which I appreciated, given the subject matter."

Pete Vonder Haar of the Houston Press gave the episode a more mixed review, saying "there were some really great touches this week: 'Nurse' Annie using a lint brush to clean feathers from the 'wounded' and administering IV Gatorade; the use of text messages as a substitute for soldiers' letters home; invisible friendship hats...but every time they returned to the documentary motif, I groaned. And the extensive battle scenes felt like filler more than anything else. There's plenty of fuel for further episodes, but I wasn't as taken with 'Pillows and Blankets' as Harmon and company intended."

References

External links
 "Pillows and Blankets" at NBC.com
 

2012 American television episodes
Community (season 3) episodes
Pillow fight